Dennis J. Paustenbach PhD, CIH, DABT, (Born Oct 29, 1952) is an American scientist, businessman, researcher, and author. Dennis is currently President of Paustenbach and Associates, which is a consulting firm who uses risk assessment techniques to characterize occupational and environmental health hazards. He is the founder and former president of ChemRisk, a consulting firm specializing in the use of toxicology and risk assessment to characterize the hazards of chemicals in soil, air, water, food, sediments and consumer products. He was, for about 4 years, a Group Vice-President of Exponent.

Paustenbach has published nearly 300 peer reviewed papers in scientific journals, about 50 book chapters, and has presented nearly 350 papers at various scientific conferences during his career. He was awarded an honorary Doctor of Science degree from Purdue University in 2006 and a Doctor of Engineering from the Rose-Hulman Institute of Technology in 2007. He has given expert testimony in many courts regarding the health hazards posed by dioxins, talc, asbestos, benzene, lead, chromium, beryllium, carbon monoxide, cobalt, chlorinated solvents, and other chemicals.

Early life and education

Paustenbach was born in Tarentum, Pennsylvania in 1952. He left his hometown after first grade and moved to Akron, Ohio, where he attended St. Matthews. His family later moved to Strasburg, Ohio, which was in a rural setting adjacent to many Amish communities, where he attended high school.

In 1974, Paustenbach graduated from the Rose Polytechnic Institute with a BS in Chemical Engineering and joined Eli Lilly and Company. After working Eli Lilly for two years as a process engineer, he felt that he wanted to study further. He left his job and enrolled at University of Michigan for an MS in Industrial Hygiene and Toxicology, which he completed in 1977. He later earned a PhD in environmental toxicology from Purdue University in 1982. While studying for his PhD, he founded the undergraduate/graduate programs in industrial hygiene at Purdue. After his PhD, he worked as the head of Risk Assessment at Stauffer Chemical in Westport, Connecticut.

Career
Paustenbach twice started the environmental consulting firm ChemRisk. The firm applied the principles of health risk assessment to quantitatively characterize the risk to humans of chemicals in foods, water, air, sediment, soil, and consumer products. They had about 125 persons in 8 locations in the U.S. In 1993, Paustenbach was selected to be the President and CEO of McLaren-Hart Environmental Engineering; a national firm with 15 offices and 600 employees.  He was the youngest CEO in the U.S. of a major firm in this industry.

In the 1980s and 1990s, Paustenbach conducted research into the dioxins and furans. Among his first major undertakings was characterizing the health hazards posed by dioxin contaminated soil including the site in Times Beach, Missouri. In the 1990s, he conducted research evaluating the hazards posed by occupational exposure to pharmaceuticals, benzene, beryllium,  and formaldehyde. Also, in the 1990s, he published many studies which evaluated the exposure and health hazards associated with exposure to hexavalent chromium  which were pertinent to Hinkley, CA and Hudson County, NJ. He worked on visible sites like Rocky Mountain, Oak Ridge, and Hanford. From about 2000 to 2018, he conducted risk assessments on as many as 1,000 exposure scenarios including asbestos exposure of auto mechanics, benzene exposure in refineries, lead in consumer products, arsenic in wine, perfluorinated chemical in groundwater, MCHM in drinking water, and the hydrocarbons in drinking water. Paustenbach and colleagues developed some of the earliest multi-pathway exposure risk assessment methods. Later, he conducted research involving the release of cobalt and chromium from medical devices  over the years .

Professor
Paustenbach has served as an adjunct professor at six universities. Specifically, University of Texas (Houston), Purdue University, University of Bridgeport, University of Massachusetts (Amherst), University of California, Irvine School of Medicine (clinical professor of Occupational Medicine), University of Michigan (Ann Arbor), and University of Kansas Medical School (Kansas City).

Philanthropy
In recent years, Paustenbach was involved in fundraising for Bellarmine College Prep, The Sacred Heart Schools, Purdue University, The University of Michigan, The Jackson Laboratory for Genomic Medicine, Peninsula Bridge of Menlo Park (California), and The Shakers of Sabbathday Lake (Maine)

Books
Two textbooks he authored/edited, The Risk Assessment of Environmental and Human Health Hazards: A Textbook of Case Studies (1989)  and Human and Ecological Risk Assessment:  Theory and Practice (2002).

Awards and honors
1992 - Howard Kusnetz Award
1997 - Outstanding Risk Practitioner by the Society for Risk Analysis
2002 - Arnold Lehman Award by Society of Toxicology
2010 - Henry Smyth Award for Contributions in Toxicology by American Conference of Governmental Industrial Hygienists
2009 - Fellow of the American Industrial Hygiene Association
2010 - Ed Baier Award by the American Industrial Hygiene Association
2012 - Fellow of the Society for Risk Analysis
2015 - Outstanding graduate of the School of Health Sciences.

See also 
 Hinkley groundwater contamination

References

External links
Dennis J. Paustenbach publications indexed by Semantic Scholar
Dennis J. Paustenbach research articles
Dennis J Paustenbach's research articles ResearchGate

1952 births
Living people
People from Tarentum, Pennsylvania
American scientists
University of Michigan alumni